Kenneth Roy Finch (born 9 June 1936) is an Australian basketball player. He competed in the men's tournament at the 1956 Summer Olympics.

References

1936 births
Living people
Australian men's basketball players
Olympic basketball players of Australia
Basketball players at the 1956 Summer Olympics
Basketball players from Sydney